Pasir Pelangi Royal Mosque is a Johor's royal mosque located in Pasir Pelangi, Johor Bahru District, Johor, Malaysia. It was constructed in the 1920s. The mosque bears a similar architectural design to the Sultan Abu Bakar State Mosque.

See also
 Islam in Malaysia

Buildings and structures in Johor Bahru
Mosques in Johor
Mosques completed in the 1920s